William LaQuayne Yates (born April 15, 1980) is an American football coach and former offensive guard who is the assistant offensive line coach for the New England Patriots of the National Football League (NFL). He played college football at Texas A&M and was signed by the Miami Dolphins as an undrafted free agent in 2003.

Yates also played for the New England Patriots and Cleveland Browns. He earned a Super Bowl ring with the Patriots in Super Bowl XXXIX.

Early years
Yates attended Corsicana High School in Corsicana, Texas, where he lettered in football, track and field, and basketball.

Playing career

College
After graduating from high school, Yates attended Texas A&M University beginning in 1999. He was a reserve offensive lineman in his first two seasons, but started 20 games over his junior and senior seasons in 2001 and 2002.

National Football League

Miami Dolphins
Yates was signed as an undrafted free agent after the 2003 NFL Draft by the Miami Dolphins. He made the Dolphins' 53-man roster out of training camp and saw action in three games as a reserve in 2003. He was waived by the Dolphins on September 5, 2004.

New England Patriots
Yates was signed to the practice squad of the New England Patriots on September 11, 2004, where he spent the remainder of the regular season and playoffs until being activated for Super Bowl XXXIX. He also began the 2005 season on the Patriots' practice squad before being activated on November 12 following the loss of starting center Dan Koppen for the season. He was a reserve offensive lineman for the remainder of the season and playoffs, while also seeing time on kickoff coverage units.

Yates began yet another season on the practice squad for the Patriots in 2006, but was activated on October 21 and a game later made his first start on October 30, 2006, against the Minnesota Vikings in place of an injured Stephen Neal. He would go on to start the Patriots' next two games at right guard but was injured in the second against the New York Jets and was placed on injured reserve, missing the remainder of the season with a broken leg. Yates, for the first time with the Patriots, made the 53-man roster to open the 2007 season; he started the second game of the year against the San Diego Chargers, his only start of the year.

When Neal began the 2008 season on the Physically Unable to Perform list, Yates started all seven games that Neal missed. He was inactive or did not play for the remainder of the season once Neal returned. Yates was released by the team on February 17, 2009, only to be re-signed two days later in a salary cap-related move.

He was released on September 4, 2009.

Cleveland Browns
Yates was signed by the Cleveland Browns on September 16, 2009. He played in seven games during his first season with the Browns, but started none. In 2010 he played in nine games, starting three.

Retirement
On August 15, 2011, Yates announced his intent to retire from football.

Coaching career

Texas A&M
In 2013, Yates was hired by Texas A&M as their strength and conditioning coach.

Texas Tech
In 2014, Yates was hired by Texas Tech as their assistant strength coach.

New England Patriots
During the summer of 2015 Yates worked with the Patriots as part of the Bill Walsh Minority Fellowship.

Bowling Green State University
In 2017, Yates was hired by Bowling Green State University as their head strength and conditioning coach.

Detroit Lions
On January 7, 2020, Yates was hired by the Detroit Lions as their assistant offensive line coach.

New England Patriots
In February 2021, Yates joined the New England Patriots coaching staff as an Offensive assistant and Assistant offensive line coach.

References

External links
Cleveland Browns bio
New England Patriots bio

1980 births
Living people
Players of American football from Fort Worth, Texas
American football centers
American football offensive guards
Texas A&M Aggies football players
Miami Dolphins players
New England Patriots players
Cleveland Browns players
Texas A&M Aggies football coaches
Texas Tech Red Raiders football coaches
Bowling Green Falcons football coaches
African-American coaches of American football
African-American players of American football
21st-century African-American sportspeople
20th-century African-American people
New England Patriots coaches